Ziziphus parryi is a species of flowering plant in the buckthorn family known by the common name Parry's jujube.

Distribution
The plant is native to the Colorado Desert and southern Mojave Desert, and to the eastern slopes of the Peninsular Ranges in southern California and Baja California, Mexico.

It can be found in Chaparral and Sonoran Desert habitats.

Description
Ziziphus parryi is a bushy shrub with many intricate branches forming a thorny tangle which may approach  in height.

The leaves are deciduous and are absent for much of the year, leaving the shrub a naked thicket of brown or grayish twigs. The ends of the twigs taper into sharp-tipped thorns. The membranous olive green leaves are up to 2.5 centimeters long.

The inflorescence is a cluster of a few several yellowish or green-tinged, star-shaped flowers with five petals. The fruit is a dry drupe containing one seed.

Varieties
Ziziphus parryi  var. parryi — California crucillo,  Parry Abrojo, lotebush.

References

External links
Calflora Database: Ziziphus parryi (Parry's jujube)
Jepson Manual eFlora (JM2) treatment of Ziziphus parryi  var. parryi
UC Photos gallery — Ziziphus parryi

parryi
Flora of California
Flora of Baja California
Flora of the California desert regions
Flora of the Sonoran Deserts
Natural history of the California chaparral and woodlands
Natural history of the Colorado Desert
Natural history of the Mojave Desert
Natural history of the Peninsular Ranges
Flora without expected TNC conservation status